Sithu Aung (also spelled Si Thu Aung; born 16 November 1996) is a Burmese professional footballer who plays as midfielder for Myanmar national football team and Yadanarbon. He has played much of his career as a left-back, he has also been used as a
winger.
Aged 13, Sithu Aung joined the youth team of Yangon United, for whom he made his professional debut in 2012 at the age of 16. He got MNL champion 6 times and played AFC Cup 3 time in 2012, 2013 and 2014. He spent three season at Yangon United club, before moving to Yadanarbon FC for undisclosed fee in the 2014 MNL transfer window and making him the third Yangon United player to join the club in 18 months.

In 2013, Sithu Aung played AFF Cup with Myanmar U-19 Team and made his senior international debut in 2014 aged 17. In 2014, Sithu Aung was chosen as MNL's best Youth Player.

Club career

Yangon United

First Team

Sithu Aung played MNL League and AFC cup in 2012,2013 and 2014. He is a shining star of the Myanmar National Team. He won MNL League twice and MFF Cup once.

Yadanarbon FC

2014-15 season

Sithu Aung made a transfer request in the 2014 transfer window, and ultimately signed for Yandanarbon FC after an undisclosed fee was reached. It was a first transfer from Yangon United to Yadanarbon. Sometimes, he plays defensive midfielder for Yadanarbon.

Sithu Aung was given the number 33 shirt upon his arrival at Yadanarbon FC and he wears number 21 shirt now.

International

International career

Myanmar U-19

Sithu Aung was chosen for Myanmar U-19 team to play AFF Cup in Indonesia.

Myanmar U-23

In 2013, Myanmar U-23 coach selected Sithu Aung to play in the SEA Games and he was a first line-up player for Myanmar U-23 Team. In 2015 SEA Games, he was chosen again and won a silver medal with Myanmar U-23 Team. He scored a total of 5 goals in the 2015 SEA Games and became a top-scorer. He was also chosen for U-23 Football tournament at Sea Games in 2017 and 2019 making him the first Burmese player to participate in 4 Sea Games consecutively.

Myanmar Senior Team

In 2014, Sithu Aung was chosen for Myanmar Senior Team and played Philippine Peace Cup 2014 with Myanmar Team. Sithu Aung won Philippine Peace Cup 2014 with Myanmar National Team.

International goals
Scores and results list Myanmar's goal tally first.

Honours

National Team
Philippine Peace Cup (1): 2014

Myanmar U23
Southeast Asian Games
 Silver Medal: 2015
 Bronze Medal: 2019

Club
Yangon United
Myanmar National League (2):  2013, 2015
Yadanarbon F.C
Myanmar National League (1):  2016
Shan United
Myanmar National League (1):  2022

Individual
 MNL's best Youth Player (1): 2014

References

https://us.soccerway.com/players/thu-aung-si/233124/

1996 births
Living people
Sportspeople from Yangon
Burmese footballers
Myanmar international footballers
Yangon United F.C. players
Yadanarbon F.C. players
Association football midfielders
Association football fullbacks
Association football utility players
Southeast Asian Games silver medalists for Myanmar
Southeast Asian Games medalists in football
Footballers at the 2018 Asian Games
Competitors at the 2015 Southeast Asian Games
Competitors at the 2013 Southeast Asian Games
Competitors at the 2017 Southeast Asian Games
Asian Games competitors for Myanmar
Competitors at the 2019 Southeast Asian Games
Southeast Asian Games bronze medalists for Myanmar